Kennedyville is an unincorporated community and census-designated place in Kent County, Maryland, United States. As of the 2010 census it had a population of 199.

Knocks Folly, Shrewsbury Church, and Woodland Hall are listed on the National Register of Historic Places.

Geography
The community is drained by tributaries of Morgan Creek, a south-flowing tributary of the Chester River.

Demographics

Education
It is in the Kent County Public Schools. Kent County Middle School is in Chestertown, and Kent County High School is in an unincorporated area, in the Butlertown census-designated place with a Worton postal address.

The community was formerly assigned to Worton Elementary School. In 2017 the school board voted to close Worton Elementary.

Notable people
 Wayne Gilchrest, former congressman from the first district of Maryland
 John Needles (1786 – 1878), Quaker abolitionist and a master craftsman of fine furniture

References

External links

Village of Kennedyville
Map of Kennedyville, from the Historical Society of Kent County collection

Census-designated places in Kent County, Maryland
Census-designated places in Maryland